Atumpan may refer to:

 Atumpan (drum), an Ashanti talking drum
 Atumpan (singer), a Ghanaian afrobeat and dancehall singer